Drylands is Mel Parsons' third album, released on 10 April 2015 on Cape Road Recordings. The album was recorded in engineer Lee Prebble's Surgery Studios in Wellington, New Zealand. One of the songs Parsons wrote was a duet, and she decided to cold e-mail Ron Sexsmith to see if he would perform the other half of the song "Don't Wait", and he agreed. Along with Ron Sexsmith, the album showcases local and international guest musicians Anika Moa, Vyvienne Long, and Trevor Hutchinson. Another song on the album, "Get Out Alive", is the result of her writing about a dangerous car accident she was in where the car rolled four times and was totaled, but she walked out without serious injury, but found herself re-evaluating her life for a time.

Track list

Personnel

Musicians
 Mel Parsons – vocals, guitar
 Gerry Paul - electric guitar, acoustic guitar, banjo, lap steel guitar
 Neil Watson - guitar
 Aaron Stewart - bass
 Trevor Hutchinson - double bass
 Craig Terris - drums
 Nick George - drums
 Ed Zuccollo - piano, Hammond organ
 Vyvienne Long - cello
 Ron Sexsmith - vocals  
 Anika Moa - backing vocals
 Andrew Keoghan - vocals  
 Lisa Tomlins - backing vocals  
 Anji Sami - backing vocals  
 Lex French - trumpet
 Ebony Lamb - choir 
 Anna Shaw - choir 
 Jamie Parlett - choir 
 Cameron "Dusty" Burnell - choir 
 Kim Bonnington - choir 
 Louis Thompson-Munn - choir 
 Imogen Holmstead-Scott - choir 
 Katie McCarthy-Burke - choir 
 Justin Firefly Clarke - choir 
 Manu Scott - choir 

Production
 Mel Parsons - producer
 Gerry Paul - producer
 Don Bartlye – mastering at Benchmark, Sydney
 Lee Prebble - engineering at the Surgery, Wellington, NZ, mixing  
 Trevor Hutchinson - additional engineering
 Don Kerr - additional engineering
 Jeremy Toy - additional engineering
 Oliver Harmer - mixing at The Lab, Auckland, NZ, additional engineering

Chart
{| class="wikitable"
!align="left"|Chart
!align="left"|Peak position
|-
|align="left"|NZ Top 40 Albums Chart
| style="text-align:center;"| 17
|-
|align="left"|Top 20 IMNZ Albums
| style="text-align:center;"| 1
|-
|}

Awards
Best Country Music Song (Alberta Sun) – 2016 New Zealand Music Awards.
Best Engineer (Lee Prebble and Oliver Harmer) - 2015 New Zealand Music Awards

References

2015 albums
Mel Parsons albums